Hamersley is a surname. Notable people with the surname include:

Hamersley family, Australian family including:
Edward Hamersley (senior) (1810–1874) 
Edward Hamersley (junior) (1835 or 1836 – 1921)
Samuel Hamersley (1842–1896)
Vernon Hamersley (1871–1946) 
Harold A. Hamersley (1896–1967), Australian World War I flying ace
Sir Hugh Hamersley (1565–1636), 17th century businessman and Lord Mayor of London
Michael Hamersley, American tax lawyer and corporate whistleblower against the accounting firm KPMG's tax shelter fraud